Extent File System (EFS) is an older extent-based file system used in IRIX releases prior to version 5.3. It has been superseded by XFS.

External links 
 EFS support for Linux
 EFS support for NetBSD

Disk file systems
IRIX